Chancelade Abbey is an Augustinian monastery in Chancelade in the Dordogne. It was founded in 1129.  

The abbey was damaged by English troops in the 14th century during the Hundred Years' War and again by Protestants in the 16th century during the French Wars of Religion.

Alain de Solminihac (beatified in 1981 by John Paul II) had the abbey restored in 1623. He was consecrated abbot of Chancelade by Urban VIII in 1636. 

Economist Nicolas Baudeau taught theology at the abbey.

A contemporary monastic community is now in occupation of some buildings and in 2016 completed a new community house on the site.

References

1129 establishments in Europe
1120s establishments in France
Augustinian monasteries in France